Brazos Bend State Park is a  state park along the Brazos River in unincorporated Fort Bend County, Texas (with a Needville postal address), run by the Texas Parks and Wildlife Department. The park is a haven for a diverse mix of native wildlife and plants covering an equally diverse range of ecosystems. Brazos Bend contains areas of coastal prairie, bottomland forest, and a wide range of wetlands including open and semi-open lakes and transitional marshlands. Highlights of the park's numerous inhabitants include over 300 species of resident and visiting migratory birds and mammals such as the white-tailed deer, nine-banded armadillo, raccoon, and North American river otter. The most noteworthy and popular residents of the park are the relatively large population of American alligators. The park is open year-round, with the exception of several weekends a year during which it is closed for controlled hunts to manage the white-tailed deer population.

History
Brazos Bend State Park occupies land bordering the Brazos River and includes within its boundaries low-lying areas left over from the River's previous meanderings. Pre-Columbian inhabitants included a series of Native American groups, most notably the Karankawa. The land passed through a variety of landowners' hands, resulting in some of the existing structures on the park grounds, including a brick cistern. The park's current nature center is built into a structure previously utilized as a hunting cabin. Over the years, improvements were made to the various water bodies in the park for both recreational and flood management purposes. A low-elevation levied walkway surrounds the perimeter of some of the larger water bodies (Elm Lake, 40 Acre Lake, etc.). While significant modifications were made to the land within the park in the past, the current management strategy is to allow, in balance with the recreational elements of the park's mission, the maintenance of a natural landscape. In 1984 the park was officially opened to the public, its lands having been donated to the state several years previously. In 2009, the park celebrated its 25th anniversary with a variety of special events and recognitions. Today the park is run by the Texas Parks and Wildlife Department, with the assistance of an active non-profit volunteer organization.

Recreational opportunities
Although it contains recreational day-use areas (including a dining hall, campground, and picnic areas) Brazos Bend is by primary character a natural park. Its recreational opportunities revolve around enjoyment of its diverse ecosystems and species. Popular activities include hiking, fishing, and wildlife viewing. Like in much of the upper Gulf Coast located along the northern vanguard areas of the Central Flyway migratory route, bird watching in Brazos Bend is a popular activity, especially during the migratory seasons. 
The park offers numerous Scouting programs, an orienteering course and is a popular spot for geocaching.

Educational programs
The Texas Parks and Wildlife staff and the Brazos Bend State Park Volunteer Organization put on a variety of education programs on a weekly basis at the park, and actively conduction outreach efforts in the local area. Popular programs include bird and photography hikes, alligator and snake education programs, and guided hikes of Creekfield Lake. In addition, a rotating assortment of crafts, story time and other educational programs are offered each week. Outside of scheduled programs, the Volunteer Organization also staffs and maintains a Nature Center containing live individuals representing many of the park's venomous and nonvenomous native snake species, baby alligators, and a host of educational displays and activities.

Annual events
In addition to the weekly hikes, educational programs, and other amenities offered by Park staff and volunteers, Brazos Bend plays host to a growing number of annual events and festivals. Highlights of the park's yearly offerings include the A Simple Christmas celebration, Prairie Heritage Days, and the July 4th Bike Parade. The park also hosts a variety of activities put on in conjunction with other entities, including the Christmas Bird Count and the Butterfly count, undertaken as part of the Audubon Society and North American Butterfly Association's national efforts, respectively. Brazos Bend State Park's Christmas Bird Count effort is routinely in the top 3-4% of the over 2000 Counts taking place in North America.

George Observatory 

The park is also home to the George Observatory, a satellite facility of the Houston Museum of Natural Science. The facility is primarily focused on public education; it includes the Challenger Learning Center for space science education and also features an exhibit of meteorites.

Gallery

See also 
 List of Texas state parks

References

External links 

 TPWD: Brazos Bend State Park
 Brazos Bend State Park Volunteer Organization
 George Observatory
 Bird Species Reported at Park

State parks of Texas
Protected areas of Fort Bend County, Texas
Protected areas established in 1984
Nature centers in Texas